Javed Raza is a  film director and producer in Pakistan.

Directing career
Before he started directing, he was a film assistant director and the assistant of a famous film star, Saeed Khan Rangeela.

He directed his first film in 1980 by the name Visa Dubai Daa, which became a super hit film. 
After Visa Dubai Daa, he directed films like Akbara, Mutthi Mai Rumaal, Dakoo Haseena, Piyasa Saavan, Kurri Munda Raazi and Amanat. In 2008, he released his film, Kabhi Pyar Na Karna.

Currently, Raza is co-directing a film, Shor Sharaba, with producer Sohail Khan and director Hasnain Hyderabadwala. The film will reportedly star Kiron Kher and Nabeel Khan, although the cast has not yet been finalized.

Filmography

Director

References

External links
  Filmography of Javed Raza on IMDb website
 Filmography of director Javed Raza on Complete Index To World Film website

Living people
Pakistani film directors
Pakistani film producers
Urdu film producers
Year of birth missing (living people)